Talari Rangaiah (born 3 June 1970) is an Indian politician, was elected to the Lok Sabha, the lower house of the Parliament of India from Anantapur, Andhra Pradesh in the 2019 Indian general election as a member of the YSR Congress Party. 

He was earlier a project director in the District Rural Development Agency or DRDA.
During his PhD, he published Research Paper In the North Asian International Research Journal Consortium (NAIRJC Journals) Under NAIRJC: A JOURNAL OF SOCIAL SCIENCE AND HUMANITIES. Research Paper Titled: THE MGNREGS AND MIGRATION OF LABOUR.

History

With a very poor background, Rangaiah did double Post Graduation, pursuing PhD in Rural Development and has been successful in cracking the government jobs at the first attempt.

His pro-poor heart and intense hardwork to uplift the lives of poor and needy has gained him a lot of goodwill and recognition among the politicians, government circles, society and media.

His management acumen, strong developmental mindset, lakhs of kilometres and thousands of hours spent with the poor and needy has made him into a top performer of the state and immensely benefited the Anantapur district. 
Being a natural leader and hard work

done for all these years, Rangaiah has a lot of craze among the Youth of Anantapur, immense support from lakhs of SHG Women and huge backing from the BOYA community.
Travelled lakhs of kilometres within the district over a period of 7 years and reached lakhs of people in need and spread across communities.

In Anantapur, he has come to be known as PD (project director) Rangaiah than his surname and whether it is about the water problem, weavers issues, civic problems etc.

Throughout his career, he worked in various state government departments with different capacities/positions.

Talari Rangaiah had voluntarily announced his retirement from his post as Additional Director in the handloom department of DRDA in the Anantapur district.

In Feb 2018, He joined  YSR Congress Party By the party chief YS Jagan Mohan Reddy as part of his Praja Sankalpa Yatra at Timmapalem of Ponnaluru Mandal. 
He had worked in Group -1 service for two decades. His entry into politics strengthens the YSR Congress party in the Anantapur district.

In 2019, He was elected to the 17th Lok Sabha of Anantapur Constituency as a Member of Parliament(MP) with a margin of 6,95,208 votes and with a majority of 1,41,428 from the YSRCP party.

In 2019, He was a Member of, the Standing Committee on Rural Development. 
He worked as a Member of, the Committee of Privileges. 
He was selected as a Member of, the Consultative Committee and Minister of Textiles.

Achievements

Rangaiah firmly believes in Patriotism & Societal Development First, Individual Growth Next.

Whether it is Salaried class people or rural SHG women whether it is pensions for old age or providing jobs for youth Rangaiah has always excelled in benefiting everyone. reaching out to everyone in every corner of the district. The entire district values him for his contributions hours of physical presence and exemplary service provided like none of the officials before.

Rangaiah has been very dedicated strategic and innovative al throughout his career, making him a top performer of the state and currently the Jobs man of Andhra Pradesh handing the employment mission of the state.

Member of Parliament Talari Rangaiah has requested Prime Minister Narendra Modi and the Ministry of Railways to introduce a Kisan Rail for transporting export-oriented horticulture produce from the state and other places in the country. In the absence of transportation facilities due to nationwide lockdown restrictions, horticulture farmers have been facing hardships to transport fruits, he said.

The MP in his letter mentioned that in the Anantapur district horticulture plantation is spread over 2.2 lakh hectares. About 52 lakh metric tonnes of papaya, pomegranate, mangoes, bananas and sweet lime are exported from the district.

The farmers normally are sending their produce to Delhi and other cities by road transport. If the Kisan Rail is introduced, the farmers can export their horticulture produce which will save time and money. Mostly the horticulture produce comes for harvesting during the months of October to May.

MP Rangaiah appealed to Prime Minister to sympathetically consider the request. Road transportation takes about 8 days to travel to Delhi while it takes 3 days via train route.

Positions Held
23 May 2019 Elected to 17th Lok Sabha
13th Sept 2019 onwards Member, Standing Committee on Rural Development
09 Oct 2019 onwards Member, Committee of Privileges Member, Consultative Committee, Ministry of Textiles

Family & Community Background
Born in a poor farmer family, unprivileged society and backward class of Boya community. Rangaiah has shined through his education and career because of sheer determination and academic excellence.

Rangaiah not only succeeded in his personal life, but he also helped his younger brothers to settle into their lives.

Rangaiah is very proud of his community and his surname Talari directly resembles and is the most popular surname of the boya community in Anantapur.

Career

20+ years of government service in extremely critical roles and projects have given immense strength and recognition.

A 6+ years term in Ananthapur district and handled all the important positions like PD. District Watershed Management. PD DRDA and PD. MEPMA and Municipal commissioner Ananthapur and Hindupur.

	1996- Group 1 Officer From Andhrapradesh cadre.
	1997- Recruited Directly Assistant Director H&T through APPSC.
	1998-1999 Worked as AD Handlooms & Textiles Chitoor Dt.
	1999-2002 worked as AD Handlooms & Textees Nellore Dt.
	2002-2006 Worked on VELUGU PROJECT in Markapur Division of Prakasham Dt.
	2006-2007 Worked as Additional PD, NREGS Anantapur.
	2007-2009 Worked as PD MEPMA Kadapa Dt.
	2009 - Worked as Additional commissioner Warangal Municipal Corporation, warangal
	2009- 2012 Worked as PD DRDA Anantapur.
	2012-2013 Worked as Municipal Commissioner. Hindupur(FAC)/Joint Director/Principal TCPSK Hindupur.
	2013-2014 Worked as Municipal Commissioner, Anantapur municipal corporation. Anantapur (FAC) / Joint Director/Principal TCPSK Hindupur.
	2014-2017 Working in the Head office in AP. Executive director. Society For Employment Generation & Enterprise Development in AP (SEEDAP), Department of Skill Development, Entrepreneurship & Innovation,  Govt. of AP)
	2017 December - Resigned For His Post as Additional Director in the handloom department of DRDA in Anantapur district and Announced Voluntary Retirement.
	2018 February - Joined the Yuvajana Sramika Rythu Congress Party(YSRCP) by party chief YS Jagan Mohan Reddy as part of his Praja Sankalpa Yatra at Timmapalem of Ponnaluru Mandal.
	 2018-2019 - Simultaneously Worked as YSRCP Parliamentary Coordinator For Both Anantapur and Hindupur constituencies.
	2019 May 23 -  Elected to the 17th Lok Sabha of Anantapur Constituency as a Member of Parliament(MP) with a majority of 1,41,428 votes from the YSRCP party.
	2019 Sept 13 - onwards Member of Standing Committee on Rural Development.
	2019 Oct 9 - onwards Member of Committee of Privileges. Member Of Consultative Committee. Ministry of Textiles.

References
"THE MGNREGS AND MIGRATION OF LABOUR" North Asian International Research Journal Consortium (NAIRJC: A JOURNAL OF  SOCIAL SCIENCE AND HUMANITIES)

External links
Official biographical sketch in Parliament of India website

India MPs 2019–present
Lok Sabha members from Andhra Pradesh
Living people
YSR Congress Party politicians
1970 births